Brigadier Clovis Kalyebara (1954–2013) was a senior army officer. He was Uganda's Military Attaché at the country's High Commission in Nairobi, Kenya, at the time of his death in May 2013. Prior to his posting to Nairobi, in February 2013, Kalyebara was the Commandant of the Uganda Military Academy, Kabamba, in Mubende District, Central Uganda.

History
Clovis Kalyebara was born in Harugongo Village, Kichwamba Sub County, in Kabarole District, Western Uganda.

Military career
Among the many positions that Clovis Kalyebara served in as a member of the Uganda People's Defence Force, are the following:
 Deputy Commander of the 2nd Uganda People's Defence Force Division, based in Gulu in 2001.
 Director of Operation in the Office of the Army Commander, at the rank of lieutenant colonel, in 2005.
 Deputy Commandant of the Uganda Senior Command and Staff College, Kimaka, Jinja District
 Uganda's military attaché to the African Union headquarters in Addis Ababa
 Commandant of the Uganda Military Academy, Kabamba, Mubende District
 Uganda's Military Attaché to the country's High Commission in Nairobi, Kenya, in 2013, at the rank of brigadier.

See also
 Wilson Mbadi
 David Muhoozi
 Leopold Kyanda
 Katumba Wamala

References

External links
 Brigadier Clovis Kalyebara Laid To Rest

Toro people
People from Kabarole District
Ugandan military personnel
Ugandan generals
1956 births
2013 deaths